The 1970 Temple Owls football team was an American football team that represented Temple University as an independent during the 1970 NCAA College Division football season. In its first season under head coach Wayne Hardin, the team compiled a 7–3 record. The team played its home games at Temple Stadium in Philadelphia.

Schedule

References

Temple
Temple Owls football seasons
Temple Owls football